Akim Begoro is a town in the Eastern region of Ghana. The town is known for the Begoro Presbyterian Senior High School.  The school is a second cycle institution.

References

Populated places in the Eastern Region (Ghana)